I liceali (English: the students of high school) is an Italian television teen drama ended in 2011. It is made of three seasons.

Plot
The show is about a group of students from the prestigious high school in Rome.

See also
List of Italian television series

External links
 

Italian television series
2008 Italian television series debuts
2011 Italian television series endings
Canale 5 original programming